Big Pond is a lake in the U.S. state of New York.

Big Pond

References

Lakes of Orange County, New York